Carles Marco Soler (born 5 April 2000) is a Spanish footballer who plays for Elche CF Ilicitano. Mainly a right back, he can also play as a right winger.

Club career
Marco was born in El Palmar, Valencian Community, and joined Valencia CF's youth setup in 2014, from Sedaví CF. In August 2019, after a short period at Burgos CF, he signed for Tercera División side UD Alzira.

Marco made his senior debut on 25 August 2019, starting and scoring the opener in a 2–0 home win against CD Roda. On 7 August of the following year, after being a regular starter, he moved to CD Mirandés and was assigned to the reserves also in the fourth division.

Marco made his professional debut on 1 November 2020, coming on as a second-half substitute for Sergio Moreno in a 0–1 away loss against CD Leganés in the Segunda División championship. The following 24 August, he moved to another reserve team, Elche CF Ilicitano in Tercera División RFEF.

References

External links

2000 births
Living people
Footballers from Valencia (city)
Spanish footballers
Association football defenders
Segunda División players
Tercera División players
Tercera Federación players
UD Alzira footballers
CD Mirandés B players
CD Mirandés footballers
Elche CF Ilicitano footballers